240 Centre Street, formerly the New York City Police Headquarters, is a building between Broome and Grand Streets in the Little Italy neighborhood of Manhattan, New York City.

History 
It was built in 1905–1909, and was designed by the firm of Hoppin & Koen. 240 Centre housed the headquarters of the New York City Police Department from 1909 to 1973, and was converted into a luxury co-op building in 1988 by the firm of Ehrenkranz Group & Eckstut.  It is now known as the Police Building Apartments.

240 Centre Street replaced an older building nearby on Mulberry Street, where Theodore Roosevelt had served as New York City Police Commissioner. Following the 1898 consolidation of the five boroughs into the City of Greater New York, the police department also expanded and needed a new headquarters building.

The Police Building was designated a New York City landmark in 1978, and was listed on the National Register of Historic Places in 1980.

Gallery

References

External links 

 The Police Building

Government buildings on the National Register of Historic Places in Manhattan
Beaux-Arts architecture in New York City
Office buildings completed in 1905
Residential buildings in Manhattan
Nolita
New York City Police Department
Government buildings completed in 1905
New York City Designated Landmarks in Manhattan
New York City Police Department buildings
1905 establishments in New York City